Topinabee (Chief Topinabee; He Who Sits Quietly; born 1758, died 1826) was a Potawatomi tribe leader and a signer of very important treaties. He was born in his father’s village on the St. Joseph River in 1758. Next to his father, Old Chief Nanaquiba, he was also noted as one of the greatest Potawatomi chiefs of all time. He was documented as a great warrior and known for his great tactical decisions in many battles like his father. Before he died in 1826, he was known as a leader of the Potawatomi tribe of the Midwestern United States. He signed the Treaty of Greenville in 1795, that ceded much of what is now Ohio to the United States. He also signed 11 later treaties during his leasership. He was succeeded as a leader of the Potawatomi by Leopold Pokagon.

Chief Topinabee is son to hereditary sachem chief of all Potawatomis, Anaquiba, and brother to Chief Chebaas, biological grandfather of Chief Abram B. Burnett (Nan-Wesh-Mah). He was a great warrior and highly respected, intelligent chief involved in battles and noted as a war chief to Tecumseh during Tecumseh's War.

Sources
Atlas of Berrien County, p. 4.
 http://www.wiskigeamatyuk.com/Chief_Topinabe.htm

Potawatomi people
Native American leaders

1826 deaths
Year of birth missing
18th-century Native Americans
19th-century Native Americans